Events from the year 1787 in Great Britain.

Incumbents
 Monarch – George III
 Prime Minister – William Pitt the Younger (Tory)
 Parliament – 16th

Events

 1 January – George III writes his first letter to Arthur Young's Annals of Agriculture, under the name of Ralph Robinson of Windsor.
 11 January – William Herschel discovers the Uranian moons Titania and Oberon.
 19 February – William Herschel first uses the 40-foot telescope under construction for him at Slough.
 13 May – Captain Arthur Phillip leaves Portsmouth with the eleven ships of the First Fleet carrying around 700 convicts and at least 300 crew and guards to establish a penal colony in Australia.
 22 May – Thomas Clarkson and Granville Sharp found the Society for Effecting the Abolition of the Slave Trade with support from John Wesley, Josiah Wedgwood and others.
 31 May – the original Lord's Cricket Ground holds its first cricket match; Marylebone Cricket Club founded.
 July – Principal Triangulation of Great Britain begun under the direction of General William Roy from Hounslow Heath; in the autumn it is extended to France.
 Summer – Calton Weavers Strike in the west of Scotland. On 3 September, six of the Calton weavers are killed by troops.

Publications
 Freed slave Ottobah Cugoano publishes Thoughts and Sentiments on the Evil and Wicked Traffic of the Slavery and Commerce of the Human Species.
 The Scots Musical Museum begins publication.

Births
 7 January – Patrick Nasmyth, Scottish landscape painter (died 1831)
 10 February – William Bradley, Britain's tallest ever man (died 1820)
 17 February – George Mogridge (Old Humphrey), miscellaneous writer and poet (died 1854)
 10 March – William Etty, painter, especially of nudes (died 1849)
 28 March – Claudius Rich, archaeologist and anthropologist (died 1821)
 7 June –  William Conybeare, geologist (died 1857)
 28 June – Harry Smith, military commander (died 1860)
 24 July – William Ward, cricketer (died 1849)
 13 September – John Adamson, antiquary and expert on Portuguese (died 1855)
 13 October – William Brockedon, painter (died 1854)
 4 November – Edmund Kean, actor (died 1833)
 21 November – Bryan Procter (Barry Cornwall), poet (died 1874)
 22 November – Copley Fielding, watercolour landscape painter (died 1855)
 16 December – Mary Russell Mitford, novelist and dramatist (died 1855)
 Ignatius Bonomi, architect (died 1870)
 John Dobson, architect (died 1865)
 Harriet Gouldsmith, landscape painter and etcher (died 1863)
 Approximate date – Ikey Solomon, receiver of stolen goods (died 1850 in Australia)

Deaths
 1 April – Floyer Sydenham, classical scholar (born 1710)
 2 April – Thomas Gage, General (born 1719)
 10 May – William Watson, physician and scientist (born 1715)
 25 July – Arthur Devis, portrait painter (born 1712)
 3 November – Robert Lowth, bishop and grammarian (born 1710)
 18 December
 Francis William Drake, British admiral and Governor of Newfoundland (born 1724)
 Soame Jenyns, English writer (born 1704)

References

 
Years in Great Britain